French provincial architecture also known as French Eclectic architecture include Manor houses or chateaux homes which were built by French aristocrats beginning in the 1600s. The homes are characterized by arched doorways and symmetrically placed elements. They are usually two stories tall with steep hipped roofs. The design came to the United States after American servicemen returned from fighting in France during World War I.

History
French provincial architecture began in rural France the 1600s. The architecture was inspired by the stylings of Versailles during the reign of King Louis XIV.  Homes found in Normandy, France are often known for the style. The first homes to be designed in the style were manor houses. French nobles built chateaus or manor houses with steep hipped roofs and an overall formal appearance. Architectural journals also refer to the style as French Eclectic architecture.

United States
In the United States following World War I the style became popular. American soldiers admired the architecture of rural France and who returned from the war they built homes in the style. In the United States the style remained popular though the 1920s. By 1932 nearly one in three homes in America had French Provincial design elements.The style fell out of favor in the 1930s, but had a resurgence in the 1960s. 

In the United States architect Frank J. Forster promoted the style. He was recognized by his peers as a master of French provincial architecture in 1927, 1928, and 1929.

Design
Elements of French provincial architecture include narrow tall windows with shutters, slate roof, copper gutters and symmetrically placed chimneys. The homes usually feature a rectangular floor plan. Exterior is usually brick or stucco with symmetrically placed exterior components. The design of doors is rectangular with an arched opening. The French provincial homes are two stories tall. The original modest designs ranged from modest farmhouses to wealthy aristocrat country estates.

References

Architectural styles
Architecture in the United States
Architecture in France
1600s architecture